Silvano Bresadola (15 June 1906 – 2002) was an Italian footballer who played as a midfielder.

He played one season in Serie A, appearing seven times for Ambrosiana-Inter in 1931–32.

References

External links
 Internazionale profile
 

1906 births
2002 deaths
Italian footballers
People from Rovereto
Association football midfielders
A.C. Trento 1921 players
Inter Milan players
F.C. Pavia players
Serie A players
Serie B players
Sportspeople from Trentino
Footballers from Trentino-Alto Adige/Südtirol